Elisabeth Kaiser ( Lier, born 4 March 1987) is a German politician of the Social Democratic Party (SPD) who has been serving as a member of the Bundestag from the state of Thuringia since 2017.

Early career 
During her studies, Kaiser worked at Telefónica Germany from 2011 until 2012. She later worked at the German Society for Policy Advice (2013–2014) and as press spokesperson of the SPD parliamentary group in the State Parliament of Thuringia (2014–2017).

Political career 
Kaiser became a member of the Bundestag in the 2017 German federal election, representing the Gera – Greiz – Altenburger Land district. She is a member of the Committee for Home Affairs and the Committee for Construction, Housing, Urban Development and Communities. 

In addition to her committee assignments, Kaiser has been a member of the German delegation to the Franco-German Parliamentary Assembly since 2019.

Other activities 
 German Foundation for Active Citizenship and Volunteering (DSEE), Member of the Board of Trustees (since 2020)
 Business Forum of the Social Democratic Party of Germany, Member of the Political Advisory Board (since 2020)
 Federal Agency for Civic Education (BPB), Member of the Board of Trustees (since 2018)
 Federal Foundation for the Reappraisal of the SED Dictatorship, Member of the Board of Trustees (since 2018)
 German United Services Trade Union (ver.di), Member

References

External links 

  
 Bundestag biography 

1987 births
Living people
Members of the Bundestag for Thuringia
Female members of the Bundestag
21st-century German women politicians
Members of the Bundestag 2017–2021
Members of the Bundestag 2021–2025
Members of the Bundestag for the Social Democratic Party of Germany